Notoscopelus kroyeri, commonly known as the lancet fish, is a species of lanternfish in the family Myctophidae. It is endemic to the North Atlantic Ocean where it is found in deep water habitats, spending its day at great depths and its night near the surface. It was previously regarded by some authorities as being a subspecies of Notoscopelus elongatus; one of the differences between the two being that N. elongatus has 25 or fewer gill rakers while N. kroyeri has 26 or more.

Description
The dorsal fin has 21 or 22 soft rays, the anal fin has 18 to 20 soft rays and the pectoral fins have 12 to 13. Like other members of the genus, it has many small photophores on the sides and flanks of the fish, arranged in a fashion that is characteristic to this species. Mature males have a gland consisting of eight or nine luminous scale-like segments on the dorsal surface of the caudal peduncle, but they lack the bioluminescent patches on the  cheek and above the eye that are characteristic of some members of the genus.

Distribution
N. kroyeri is endemic to the North Atlantic Ocean, its range lying between 40°N to 60°N on the western side and between 37°N and 70°N on the eastern side.

References

Myctophidae
Fish of the Atlantic Ocean
Fish described in 1861
Taxa named by August Wilhelm Malm